Young Nationals or Young Nats may refer to:

 the youth wing of a National Party
 Young Nationals (Australia), the youth wing of the National Party of Australia
 New Zealand Young Nationals, the youth wing of the New Zealand National Party
 Young Nationalists Organisation, the youth wing of the Nationalist Party of Australia

See also
 Nat Young (disambiguation)
 NATS (disambiguation)
 NAT (disambiguation)
 Young (disambiguation)
 National (disambiguation)
 Nationals (disambiguation)